Haugaland og Sunnhordland District Court is a district court located in Vestland and Rogaland counties in Norway. This court is based at two different courthouses which are located in Haugesund and Leirvik. The court serves the southern part of Vestland county and the northern part of Rogaland county. This court takes cases from 17 municipalities. The court in Haugesund accepts cases from the municipalities of Bokn, Etne, Haugesund, Karmøy, Sauda, Suldal, Tysvær, Utsira, and Vindafjord. The court in Leirvik accepts cases from the municipalities of Bømlo, Fitjar, Kvinnherad, Stord, Sveio, and Tysnes. The court is subordinate to the Gulating Court of Appeal.

The court is led by a chief judge and several other judges. The court is a court of first instance. Its judicial duties are mainly to settle criminal cases and to resolve civil litigation as well as bankruptcy. The administration and registration tasks of the court include death registration, issuing certain certificates, performing duties of a notary public, and officiating civil wedding ceremonies. Cases from this court are heard by a combination of professional judges and lay judges.

History
This court was established on 26 April 2021 after the old Haugaland District Court and Sunnhordland District Court were merged into one court. The new district court system continues to use the courthouses from the predecessor courts.

References

District courts of Norway
2021 establishments in Norway
Organisations based in Haugesund
Organisations based in Leirvik